The 1889 Costa Rican general election was held between 7 October 1889 (first degree) and 1 December 1889 (second degree). It was particularly notorious for been the first time in Costa Rica's history that political parties took part in an election. The date of November 7 is still commemorated in Costa Rica as "Democracy's Day" due to the outcome of the liberal government accepting the results of the conservative opposition, as to that point, authoritarian governments were the norm. 

Liberals were by far the hegemonic faction in Costa Rica's politics since independence. Unlike other Latin American countries were conflicts and alternation between liberals and conservatives was common, all Costa Rican presidents since the first, Juan Mora Fernández, were liberals with only one exception; Vicente Herrera Zeledón who, despite been conservative, was still a puppet of liberal dictator Tomás Guardia. A series of alliances between the liberal intellectual elite, the coffee-grower bourgeoisie and the army kept the status quo into what was known as Costa Rica's Liberal State. 

However, relationships with the Catholic Church were normally cordial. It wasn't until the presidency of freemason and staunch liberal Bernardo Soto Alfaro that the most secularizing and anti-Catholic policies were taken, that the relationships between the two stained. 

The Church responded by endorsing its own candidate; lawyer José Joaquín Rodríguez Zeledón of the Democratic Constitutional Party. The liberals, including Soto's government, endorsed Ascensión Esquivel Ibarra from the "Olympus" group, a group of intellectual aristocrats nicknamed as such because of their elitism. Soto went even as far as to allow Esquivel to run the presidency for a while. The Constitutional Party identify itself by using the National pavilion, whilst the Liberal Progressive Party used a red flag, the traditional color of the liberals in Latin America. During the campaign Rodríguez was accused of trying to impose a religious government (despite the fact that he publicly endorsed the need for church-state separation) whilst Esquivel was signaled for Freemason, liberal and Nicaraguan.

The election at the time was held in two levels; first all the male citizens allowed to voted the second-degree electors, then the electors selected the President from among the candidates. The first round of vote was public, the second was secret. The requirements to be an Elector generally included having properties and knowing how to read, which meant that most of them belonged to the rich families or the middle class. Rodríguez won  the popular vote but Soto proclaimed Esquivel the winner and a military parade in support of Esquivel was held on November 7. The Church made a call to defend the results on the streets on November 7 and Soto, fearful of a civil war, resigned and his successor Carlos Durán Cartín handles the power to Rodríguez.

Results
Second grade electors

References

Elections in Costa Rica
1889 elections in Central America
1889 in Costa Rica